Operation Artemis may refer to:

 Operation Artemis, a European Union-led UN authorized military mission to the Democratic Republic of the Congo during the Ituri conflict
 Operation Artemis (Law Enforcement), a Multi-Agency New Mexico Law Enforcement Statewide Operation against Child Pornography Offenders in 2012